The 1963 Mediterranean Games, officially known as the IV Mediterranean Games, and commonly known as Naples 1963, were the 4th Mediterranean Games. The Games were held in Naples, Italy over 8 days, from 21 to 29 September 1963, where 1,057 athletes (all men) from 13 countries participated. There were a total of 93 medal events from 17 different sports.

Participating nations
The following is a list of nations that participated in the 1963 Mediterranean Games:

 (72)
 (72)
 (117)
 (54)
 (36)
 (3)
 (108)
 (108)
 (72)
 (46)
 (99)
 (144)
 (126)

Venues
Stadio San Paolo
Stadio Arturo Collana
PalaArgento
Velodromo Albricci
Piscina Felice Scandone
Lago di Patria

Sports
The IV Mediterranean Games sports program featured 93 events in 17 sports. The numbers in parentheses represent the number of medal events per sport.

Medal table

References
 Serbian Olympic Committee
International Mediterranean Games Committee
Mediterranean Games Athletic results at gbrathletics website

External links
Complete 1963 Mediterranean Games Standings

 
Mediterranean Games
International sports competitions hosted by Italy
Multi-sport events in Italy
Sports competitions in Naples
Mediterranean Games by year
Mediterranean Games
September 1963 sports events in Europe
20th century in Naples